Marc Thomas (born 15 July 1990) is a Welsh rugby union player. A prop forward.

Thomas previously played for Bridgend RFC and the Ospreys. On 4 May 2016, Thomas joined RFU Championship club Jersey Reds from the 2016–17 season. However, on 3 February 2017, Thomas left the club with immediate effect to join Welsh region Cardiff Blues back in the Pro12.

On 24 July 2017, Thomas returned to the English Championship with Yorkshire Carnegie prior to the 2017–18 season.

He joined rival Championship club Doncaster Knights ahead of the 2019–20 season. Thomas joined Harlequins on a short-term deal for the end of the 2020 and subsequently at the end of that deal, signed with Worcester Warriors for the start of the 2020–21 season.

References

External links
 Ospreys profile

Welsh rugby union players
Ospreys (rugby union) players
1990 births
Living people
Rugby union players from Merthyr Tydfil
Leeds Tykes players
Jersey Reds players
Cardiff Rugby players
Doncaster Knights players
Harlequin F.C. players
Worcester Warriors players
Rugby union props